The women's pentathlon at the 1962 European Athletics Championships was held in Belgrade, then Yugoslavia, at JNA Stadium on 14 September 1962.

Medalists

Results

Final
14 September

Participation
According to an unofficial count, 13 athletes from 9 countries participated in the event.

 (1)
 (1)
 (1)
 (1)
 (3)
 (1)
 (2)
 (2)
 (1)

References

Pentathlon
Combined events at the European Athletics Championships
Euro